The Akilathirattu Ammanai the scripture of Ayyavazhi teaches Dharma on two different perspectives. One in sociology as charity and truth (in behavior) and another under spirituality to attain the stage of Oneness, unified into Lord Vaikundar. This state of ultimate oneness is called as Dharma Yukam or Dharma Pathi. Akilam also says that, Dharma is the only living wheel. The sociological way is asked to be followed by every one to attain the spiritual state of Dharma.

Sociological conception

The sociological definition to Dharma is generated as a concrete activity of charity or almsgiving. The principle of Dharma was considered as the mission of "protecting or salvaging the lowly, the oppressed". The disparity among the people is to be reduced and eradicated by this act of charity. A quote in Vinchai reads, "To uplift the lowely is dharmam". In this way, people were specially exhorted to undertake charity on material goods, and do it without discriminating among the beneficiaries. The Indian saint, Swami Vivekananda applied this principle of 'Social-Dharma' concept in practice and this may lead support to the people who claim that he was influenced by the religion.

Spiritual conception

Transposed to the spiritual plane, the concept of Dharma is propounded as  'principle of righteousness' . Ayyavazhi asserts that the prime motive of the Avatar of Vaikundar was to establish Dharma in this world by destroying the evil force of Kaliyan. The definition of Kali in Ayyavazhi is focused as the materialized life. So spiritual understanding of Dharma in Ayyavazhi is the life in ultimate harmony with nature or unbounded by space and time. The narration of the concept 'Ekam', 'the ultimate oneness' in Akilam right from the beginning points out it clearly. 

And after ending the Kali Yukam, Dharma Yukam, the 'world of righteousness', is said to be ruled over by Vaikundar as an ever lasting King. There will be only on religion and only one race. All the people there will be with supreme bliss and knowledge. But on the way, it detached the caste identities by stating that it was not suited for the present Kali Yukam. A quote in Akilam reads,

"Cast away the head-shaking devils and the eighteen castes in to the sea, mountain and fire."

Yuga Dharma

As per Ayyavazhi ideology, Lord Vaikundar incarnated in the world for destroying the evil force of Kali, which is the sixth foremost and the most serious manifestation of the evil Kroni. Because of the serious nature of Kaliyan and the boons claimed by him. So the power of the 'Supreme Ekam' was given birth as son of Lord Narayana in the Name of Vaikundar. Hence Vaikundar is not only a unique avatar but also the only able power to destroy the evil Kali. Hence it's necessary for oneself to follow Vaikundar, who is not influenced by Kali  to overcome the aspect of Kali. Vaikundar was the only eligible figure to forgive the sin of Kali since he was the only figure gets unaffected to Kali. So Vaikundar and his teachings are important to be spread. And this spreading the gospel of Vaikundar is told as the Yuga dharma for this Kali Yuga.  

So the spread of teachings of Vaikundar is taught to be nessaccery for the fast destruction of Kali. It was also considered that Vaikundar too ordered his followeres to propagate his teachings. The five Citars of Vaikundar and the Thuvayal Pandarams are seemingly the first among the propagators of the teachings of Vaikundar. It also seems that Vaikundar's teachings are spread even before Akilathirattu Ammanai is written down.

Dharma for other beings

After teaching the Dharma for Human beings Vaikundar also taught Dharma also for Animals, birds, reptiles, plants etc. He ordered the animals to live in harmony to each other and do not quarrel with others. He also ordered them to take only vegetarian foods (to eat only plants). They all were also ordered to drink water from same place. They were also asked only to obey Vaikundar and to remain with forbearance. Then he ordered the birds to live with harmony with one another and not to quarrel in the name of being large and small. Treat great, only the strong and bold faith over Lord Vaikundar. The plants are also ordered to maintain patience and forbearance and to remain humble.  As a whole from human beings to plants, all are ordered to maintain forbearance and to live in harmony with one another.

See also

 Ayyavazhi ethics
 Main teachings of Ayya Vaikundar
 Neetham
 Ayyavazhi theology

References
 G.Patrick, 2003, Religion and Subaltern Agency, University of Madras.
 A. Ari Sundara Mani, 2002, Akilathirattu Ammanai Parayan Urai, Ayya Vaikunda Thirukkudumbam.
 N. Vivekanandan, 2003, Akilathirattu Ammanai Moolamum Uraiyum, Vivekananda Pathippakam.
 R. Ponnu, 2000, Sri Vaikunda Swamigal and Struggle for Social Equality in South India, Ram Publishers.
 R. Ponnu, 2002, Ayya Vaikunda Swamigal Ore Avataram, Ram Publishers.

Ayyavazhi